Parapriacanthus is a genus of sweepers native to the Indian Ocean and the western Pacific Ocean. Parapriacanthus are bioluminescent, with ventral light organs for counter-illumination. Parapriacanthus luciferase is a kleptoprotein, obtained from their diet on bioluminescent ostracods.

Species
There are currently 11 recognized species in this genus:
 Parapriacanthus argenteus (von Bonde, 1923) 
 Parapriacanthus darros J. E. Randall & Bogorodsky, 2016      
 Parapriacanthus dispar (Herre, 1935) (Deep bullseye)
 Parapriacanthus elongatus (McCulloch, 1911) (Slender bullseye)
 Parapriacanthus guentheri (Klunzinger, 1871) 
 Parapriacanthus kwazulu J. E. Randall & Bogorodsky, 2016 
 Parapriacanthus marei Fourmanoir, 1971 (Red-fin sweeper)
 Parapriacanthus punctulatus J. E. Randall & Bogorodsky, 2016 
 Parapriacanthus rahah J. E. Randall & Bogorodsky, 2016 
 Parapriacanthus ransonneti Steindachner, 1870 (Pygmy sweeper)
 Parapriacanthus sharm J. E. Randall & Bogorodsky, 2016

References

Pempheridae
Taxa named by Franz Steindachner
Marine fish genera
Bioluminescent fish